The Legend of Broken Sword, also known as Dragon of the Lost Ark or Dressed to Fight, is a 1979 wuxia film directed by Ulysses Au-yeung and written by Gu Long. The lead character, Hu Tiehua, appears in Gu Long's Chu Liuxiang novel series as well.

Cast
Tien Peng as Hu Tiehua
Doris Lung as Hung
Man Kong-lung as Golden Bell Tang
Ling Yun
Elsa Yeung as Mai-ting
Au Lap-bo
Goo Chang
Su Chen-ping
Cheung Chung-kwai
Li Jian-ping
Yeung Gwan-gwan
Wong Yiu
Mo Man-sau
Shih Ting-ken
Cheung Hung-gei
Woo Hon-cheung

References

External links

1979 films
Hong Kong martial arts films
Taiwanese martial arts films
Wuxia films
Works based on Chu Liuxiang (novel series)
Films based on works by Gu Long
1970s Hong Kong films